Abu al-Mahasin Yusuf al-Mustanjid bi'llah, (died 7 April 1479) was the fourteenth Abbasid caliph of Cairo for the Mamluk Sultanate between 1455 and 1479.

Life 
Al-Mustanjid was the son of Al-Mutawakkil I. His given name was Yusuf and his Kunya was Abu al-Mahasin.

The 1455 mutiny convinced caliph al-Qa'im to abandon his support for Sayf ad-Din Inal and join the uprising. With the caliph providing symbolic legitimacy to the mamluks, they took up arms and assaulted the citadel. Finding himself faced with no alternatives, Inal launched an offensive against the mutineers. The Royal Mamluk Guard of the citadel resisted the rebels and eventually dispersed the Zahiris. Inal had al-Qa'im arrested and imprisoned in Alexandria. He was replaced by al-Mustanjid. All mamluks with the exception of the royal guard were removed from their positions in citadel and some of the mutineers were either imprisoned or exiled. Despite the insurrection, Inal supplied the mamluks with the camels they sought and the expedition to al-Buhayra was carried out.

The Sultan was Al-Ashraf Inal, but the unrest continued throughout his reign. He died in 865 AH. The Caliph then took his son Ahmed, who took the title of Al-Muayyad. Ramadan of the same year, and took the title of apparent Saif al-Din Khashdq. Sultan Al-Zaher Khashash continued in the Sultanate for seven years and died in the first spring of 872. He took the caliph, Prince Belbaei, who took the title of his predecessor Al-Zaher al-Din, but only two months later, The title "Al-Zaher" also, and two months after taking over the Sultanate, the soldiers also beat him and took him off. The Sultanate was given to Prince Khair Bey in the evening and in the morning he was taken off by soldiers. Then the Sultanate took over the Emir Qaytbay and took the title of Al-Ashraf. He settled for twenty-nine years and took things firmly. He condemned him. As a result of the stability of his days, he went to the construction of roads, bridges, schools and mosques. Against the Emirate of (Zulkadir) Turkmen, which is located on the outskirts of the Levant between the countries that owe to the Ottomans and the country under the Mamluks sent a campaign in 876 AH against the Shah of the leader of this emirate, the Sultan Mohammed Al-Fateh supports and supports this Prince of Turkmen, To take over "Entebbe", "Adana" and "Tarsus", Shah Sawar himself was taken to Cairo and he was hanged on the door of Zewailah in 877 AH. The commander of the campaign, Prince Ishbak, appointed Prince Budak as Emir of the state of Zulkadir, one of the dependents of the Mamluks. In 877 AH prince Ishbak also led a campaign against the second Turkmen state (the white shah), whose then ruler was Hassan al-Tawil, who raided the suburbs of Aleppo. Prince Yashbak was able to win the battle of beer on the Euphrates. Prince Hassan al-Tawil died in 883 AH and was succeeded by his son Ya'qub Amir al-Raha. In 884 AH. 

Al-Mustansjid died on the 14th of Muharram in 1479 after he was wounded and left sick for two months, and was succeeded by his nephew Al-Mutawakkil II (Abdul Aziz bin Yaqoub).

References

Bibliography

1479 deaths
15th-century Abbasid caliphs
Cairo-era Abbasid caliphs
Year of birth unknown
Sons of Abbasid caliphs